William Greenwood (1875 – 19 August 1925) was Conservative MP for Stockport from 1920 to 1925. He was first elected in the 1920 Stockport by-election, and was re-elected in the General Elections of 1922, 1923 and 1924. He died in office, causing the 1925 Stockport by-election.

In 1920, he made a significant contribution to the purchase price of "The Towers" in Didsbury, Manchester, to be used as the research centre for the British Cotton Industry Research Association, and asked that the building be named after his daughter, so the facility became known as the Shirley Institute.

References

External links 
 

People from Stockport
1875 births
1925 deaths
Conservative Party (UK) MPs for English constituencies
UK MPs 1918–1922
UK MPs 1922–1923
UK MPs 1923–1924
UK MPs 1924–1929
Members of the Parliament of the United Kingdom for Stockport